Tridu Songtsen, Tridu Songtsen or Dusong Mangban, (b.668 – 704d.; r. 676–704 CE) was an emperor of the Tibetan Empire from 676 to 704.

Ascent to throne

'Dus-rong ascended the Tibetan throne after the death of his father, Mangsong Mangtsen, in 676. The Old Book of Tang says that 'Dus-srong was eight years old in 679 — nine years old by Western reckoning. He was, therefore, presumably born in 670 and was six or seven years old when he began his reign. Due to his youth, he was enthroned with the minister Gar Tongtsen's second son, Khri 'bring, to act as regent.

Political and military activities
In 676 the Tibetans made raids on Shanzhou, Guozhou, Hezhou (now Linxia), Diezhou, Migong and Danling in Gansu. The Chinese counterattacked, defeating the Tibetans at Longzhi. The Chinese army led by Li Jingxuan were soundly defeated near Qinghai Lake, however, and by the end of 677 Tibet controlled the whole of the Tarim Basin and the mountainous regions to the southwest.

Revolt of Zhangzhung and the leadership of his mother, Krimalod, and his ministers
The western kingdom of Zhangzhung revolted soon after the death of King Mangsong Mangtsen (also known as Trimang Löntsen, r. 650–677), the son of Songtsen Gampo, but was brought back under Tibetan control by the "firm governance of the great leaders of the Mgar clan" the following year.

Under the leadership of his powerful mother, Khri ma lod, and his ministers and generals during the early part of his reign, Tibet continued to maintain and even expand its territory.

The Tibetans gained control of an important Tang fortress at Anrong in 678 on the Min River north of Chengdu which they held for more than sixty years as a frontier post. According to an 11th-century Chinese history, the Erhe people from the Erhai Lake region in 'Jang, one of the princedoms around the upper waters of the Yangtze which later made up Nanzhao, submitted to Tibet this same year, asking for an alliance against the Chinese. The Old Book of Tang reports:

The Chinese army led by Wei Daijia unsuccessfully invaded Tibet in 689. Many of the soldiers died and the commander of the troops was executed for his failure. It was also in this year that the Tibetan princess Khri-bangs was married to an 'A-zha chief to strengthen bonds between the two peoples. They had a son named Ma-ga Thogon Khagan.

Two Tibetan generals defected to the Chinese with their troops in 692. The Chinese then defeated the Tibetans, regaining control of the Tarim Basin and the lucrative trade routes to the West, which they held for almost a century before the Tibetans reconquered the region.

The Turkish Khagan Ton-ya-bgo (Ch. Ashina Tuizi), chief of the Western Dulu in Dzungaria, visited the Tibetan court in 694. together they attacked and defeated the Chinese at Lengjuan.

The following year 'Dus-rong successfully attacked Lintao, and Liangzhou.

Gar Trinring Tsendro went to Chang'an in 696 to try to negotiate peace with Empress Wu Zetian (r. 684–705) on condition that China remove all troops from Central Asia and divide the Western Turks between China and Tibet. She refused to negotiate.

'Dus-srong realised that members of the mGar family had become independent warlords and posed a threat to the central authority of the king. So, in 699 he pretended to organise a great hunt and then had his men turn on members of the mGar and their supporters. Then he personally marched north and confronted Gar Trinring Tsendro, who surrendered without a fight and, according to the Old Book of Tang, committed suicide. His brother fled to China.

After this, 'Dus-srong asserted the right of the power of the king over his ministers.

'Dus-srong personally led 10,000 troops into four battles in some unnamed place to the northeast in 702. The next year he "established his authority over the 'Jang (Nanzhao), he imposed tribute on the White Mywa, he subdued the Black Mywa (probably the Miao people), and so on."

Relations with Nepal
It seems Nepal remained tributary to Tibet throughout the reign of 'Dus-rong. A Nepalese stone edict of 695, during the reign of the Licchavi king, Shivadeva II, records: "because of the reason that Nepal paid taxes to Tibet, five officials must take the responsibility of the coolies who carry the  [sic = luggage?] every year." This is confirmed by the Old Book of Tang which record that in 703, soon after 'Dus-rong's death, "the subject countries in the south, such as Nepal and others, all revolted." Furthermore, the Tibetan Annals record that 'Dus-rong spent the summers of 690, 697 and 699 in Nepal.

His wives and son
'Dus-srong he married two women from important Tibetan clans — 'Dam-gyi Cog-ro-bza', and Chimza Tsunmotog (Wylie: mChims-bza' bTsan-ma Thog-thog-sten), Princess of Chim, with whom he had a son Khri-lde-gtsug-btsan (also known later as Mes-ag-thoms) in 704. It seems 'Dus-rong also had a Turkish bride, as the Tibetan Annals record the death of the princess "Gatun" (= Turk: Khatun?) in 708.

His support of Buddhism
Although 'Dus-srong is primarily remembered as a warrior, according to the Testament of Ba, he supported Buddhism and had a temple called Khri rtse built in Gling Khams, "and so on", which is recorded on an inscription at sKarchung written by Emperor Sadnalegs about a century later.

'Dus-srong's death and succession
'Dus-srong died in 704 in battle in Mywa territory in modern Yunnan. The Tang Annals state he was on his way to suppress tributary kingdoms on the southern borders of Tibet, including Nepal and parts of India. There was a dispute among his sons but, "after a long time" the people put seven year old Qilisuzan, later known as Me Agtsom, on the throne.

'Dus-srong is buried next to his father in the Royal Burial grounds near Yarlung.

Notes

References
 Richardson, Hugh E. (1985). A corpus of early Tibetan inscriptions. London: Royal Asiatic Society. 
 Lee, Don Y. (1981). The History of Early Relations between China and Tibet: From Chiu t'ang-shu, a documentary survey. Bloomington, IN: Eastern Press. 

  
  

Tibetan emperors
Buddhist monarchs
7th-century rulers in Asia
8th-century rulers in Asia
670 births
704 deaths
7th-century Tibetan people
8th-century Tibetan people
Child monarchs from Asia
7th-century Buddhists
8th-century Buddhists